Yanet Núñez Mojarena (born 2 July 1981) is a Cuban former tennis player.

Núñez Mojarena won five doubles titles on the ITF Women's Circuit. On 14 October 2002, she reached her best singles ranking of world No. 722. On 24 July 2006, she peaked at No. 421 in the doubles rankings.

Playing for Cuba Fed Cup team, Núñez Mojarena has a win–loss record of 30–28 in Fed Cup competition.

ITF finals

Singles (0–1)

Doubles (5–3)

References

External links
 
 
 

1981 births
Living people
Cuban female tennis players
Pan American Games medalists in tennis
Pan American Games bronze medalists for Cuba
Tennis players at the 2003 Pan American Games
Central American and Caribbean Games medalists in tennis
Central American and Caribbean Games silver medalists for Cuba
Central American and Caribbean Games bronze medalists for Cuba
Tennis players at the 2007 Pan American Games
Medalists at the 2003 Pan American Games
21st-century Cuban women
20th-century Cuban women